The 2003 Talk 'N Text Phone Pals season was the 14th season of the franchise in the Philippine Basketball Association (PBA) and third season under the management of Smart Communications.

Draft picks

Transactions

Occurrences
February 27: PBA Suspends Asi Taulava for two games after he was found to have traces of Marijuana during a mandated test conducted by league physician Ben Salud.

April 12: Phone Pals coach Paul Woolpert was fired by the management and named assistant coach Joel Banal as his interim replacement.

May 6: Forward Norman Gonzales was also tested positive of banned substance, he was the fifth player to be suspended indefinitely by the PBA and was ordered to undergo a six-month rehabilitation.

August 15: Talk 'N Text acting head coach Ariel Vanguardia, who took over from Joel Banal, when the latter decided to honor his commitment with the Ateneo Blue Eagles in the UAAP, was slapped with a five-game suspension and a P50,000 fine while the team P250,000 in a game-sham that took place on August 13 when the Phone Pals tried to extend a winning ballgame against Red Bull in overtime by deliberately shooting on the Barako's goal, Talk 'N Text representative to the PBA board Ricky Vargas said the team will appeal the five-game suspension to Commissioner Noli Eala since the Phone Pals cannot hire an interim coach for five games starting the Third Conference.

Championship
The Talk 'N Text Phone Pals won their first championship in the All-Filipino Cup by defeating the defending champions Coca Cola Tigers. The Phone Pals lost the first two games of the series but won the next four to clinch their first title in 13 years, not counting the 1998 Centennial Cup triumph. Asi Taulava was voted finals MVP of the series.

Awards
Asi Taulava won the coveted Most Valuable Player (MVP) Award, aside from winning the Best Player of the Conference in the All-Filipino Cup.
Jimmy Alapag won the Rookie of the Year honors.

Roster

Game results

All-Filipino Cup

References

TNT Tropang Giga seasons
Talk